The Divisaderan age is a South American land mammal age, covering a period of geologic time (42.0–36.0 Ma) within the Middle and Late Eocene epochs of the Paleogene. It follows the Mustersan age and is followed by the Tinguirirican age.

Etymology 
The age is named after the Divisadero Largo Formation of Divisadero Largo, Mendoza, Argentina.

Formations

Fossils

References

Bibliography 
General
 

Divisadero Largo Formation
 

Abanico Formation
 
 
 
 
 
 

Andesitas Huancache Formation
 
 

Chota Formation
 

Guabirotuba Formation
 

Leticia Formation
 

Loreto Formation
 
 
 
 

Paracas Group
 

Pozo Formation
 
 

Sarmiento Formation
 
 
 
 
 
 
 
 
 
 

Soncco Formation
 

Yumaque Formation
 

 
Eocene South America
Paleogene Argentina